Christopher Crowe (born August 1, 1948) is an American screenwriter, film producer, and film director.

Crowe was born in Racine, Wisconsin, and graduated from William Horlick High School in 1967. In the mid-1970s, he was working for an East Coast magazine, but returned home to Racine. While working at his father's graphic arts company, he created the logo for the band Cheap Trick.

He has written the screenplays for The Last of the Mohicans, Nightmares, The Mean Season, Fear, and The Bone Collector He also wrote and directed Off Limits and Whispers in the Dark. 

He created the television shows Seven Days, The Watcher, The Untouchables, H.E.L.P., B.L. Stryker, and B. J. and the Bear. He was also executive producer of the 1985 TV revival of Alfred Hitchcock Presents.

The German-born imposter who's real name is Christian Gerhartsreiter had at some point in the 1990s renamed himself "Christopher C. Crowe" and claimed that he was a producer of the 1980s revival of Alfred Hitchcock Presents, effectively stealing the real Crowe's identity.

Filmography

Films

Television

References

External links
 
 Christopher Crowe @ discogs.com
Christopher Crowe @ thetvdb.com
Christopher Crowe @ bfi.org

1948 births
Living people
20th-century American male writers
20th-century American screenwriters
21st-century American male writers
21st-century American screenwriters
American film producers
American male screenwriters
American male television writers
American television directors
American television producers
American television writers
Film directors from Wisconsin
Film producers from Wisconsin
Screenwriters from Wisconsin
William Horlick High School alumni
Writers from Racine, Wisconsin